Shereen Audi (born 1970 in Amman) is a Jordanian visual artist.

She graduated from the Institute of Fine Arts in Amman in 1992. She has continued her studies at the Jordan National Gallery of Fine Arts Print Workshop and the Darat al Funun Summer Academy, studying art and printmaking. There, she worked with artists including Khaled Khries, Nedim Kufi, Mahmoud Obaidi, and Lynne Allen.

After graduating from the Institute of Fine Arts, Audi began displaying her work in exhibitions. In the first years of her career, she primarily painted. Later on, she would begin working with mixed media, video art and photography.

Audi advocates equality and full rights for women so that they can achieve their full creative potential. The themes of women and female identity frequently appear in her work.

In her work, she uses various media, including acrylic paint, photography and video art. Audi favours red, black and white in her art. Besides at least ten solo shows, she has participated in group exhibitions in Germany, Bahrain, Lebanon, Algeria, Egypt, and Jordan. In her 10th solo show, Dreams Give Hope, she exhibited collages. In Wall Street International, Rawan Al Adwan described Audi's work as "characterized by simplicity in applying the colors on the canvas without mixing them, an altered perspective including longitudinal and cross lines." Audi has cited Joan Miró, Pablo Picasso, Jackson Pollock, Franz Kline, Robert Motherwell, Andy Warhol, and Arab contemporary artists as among her influences.

Audi currently resides in Amman.

References

External links 
 A review of one of Audi's exhibitions
 Saatchi Art profile

1970 births
Living people
Jordanian contemporary artists
People from Amman
Jordanian women painters
Women video artists
Jordanian women photographers
21st-century women photographers